Keith Hoerig (born August 4, 1972) is the former bass guitarist for Five Iron Frenzy and Brave Saint Saturn. Following Five Iron Frenzy's break-up in 2003, he assisted former band-mate Reese Roper with booking his new band, Roper.

He lives in Denver, Colorado. He and his wife Eryn perform in a number of projects including alt-country band The Hollyfelds, vintage pop band The Jekylls, and country duets project The Kingbyrds.

He chose not to participate in Five Iron Frenzy's 2011 reunion and was replaced on bass guitar by the band's former guitarist Scott Kerr, who had initially left the band in 1998.

References

External links
The Hollyfelds
The Jekylls
The Kingbyrds

1972 births
Living people
Musicians from Denver
American performers of Christian music
Five Iron Frenzy members
Guitarists from Colorado
21st-century American bass guitarists